Ecliptopera rectilinea is a species of moth of the family Geometridae first described by William Warren in 1894. It is found in the north-eastern parts of the Himalayas, Taiwan, northern Thailand, Peninsular Malaysia, Borneo, Bali, Sumbawa and Sulawesi.

Subspecies
Ecliptopera rectilinear rectilinea
Ecliptopera rectilinea kanshinensis (north-eastern parts of the Himalayas, Taiwan)
Ecliptopera rectilinea impingens (Peninsular Malaysia, Borneo, Bali, Sumbawa)
Ecliptopera rectilinea fortis (Sulawesi)

External links
"Ecliptopera rectilinea Warren, 1894 ". Moths of Northern Thailand. Archived from the original March 4, 2016.

Cidariini